Aimé-Joseph Raymond Escudie (28 May 1927 – 24 November 2015) was a French boxer. He competed in the men's middleweight event at the 1948 Summer Olympics.

References

1927 births
2015 deaths
French male boxers
Olympic boxers of France
Boxers at the 1948 Summer Olympics
Sportspeople from Béziers
Middleweight boxers